The 2018 Cronulla-Sutherland Sharks season was the 52nd in the club's history. Coached by Shane Flanagan and captained by Paul Gallen and Wade Graham, they competed in the National Rugby League's 2018 Telstra Premiership.

Fixtures

Pre-season

Regular season

Finals Series

Ladder

Squad

Player movements
Source:

Losses
 Gerard Beale to New Zealand Warriors
 Jack Bird to Brisbane Broncos
 Fa'amanu Brown to Canterbury-Bankstown Bulldogs
 Manaia Cherrington to New Zealand Warriors (mid-season)
 Jordan Drew to Townsville Blackhawks (mid-season)
 Chris Heighington to Newcastle Knights
 Malakai Houma to Newtown Jets
 Jaimin Jolliffe to Newtown Jets
 Jeremy Latimore to St George Illawarra Dragons
 James Maloney to Penrith Panthers
 Jayden McDonogh to Newtown Jets
 Daniel Mortimer to Leigh Centurions (mid season)
 Sam Tagataese to Brisbane Broncos
 Jayden Walker to Penrith Panthers
 Tony Williams to Parramatta Eels

Gains

 Josh Dugan from St George Illawarra Dragons
 Aaron Gray from South Sydney Rabbitohs
 Trent Hodkinson from Newcastle Knights
 Matt Moylan from Penrith Panthers
 James Segeyaro from Leeds Rhinos (mid-season)
 Ava Seumanufagai from Wests Tigers
 Scott Sorensen from Canberra Raiders
 Braden Uele from North Queensland Cowboys

Representative honours
The following players have played a first grade representative match in 2018. (C) = Captain

Squad statistics 
Statistics Source:
Statistics current as of Round 25

References

Cronulla-Sutherland Sharks seasons
Cronulla-Sutherland Sharks season